The Forromeco River is a river of Rio Grande do Sul state in southern Brazil. It is a tributary of the Caí River.

See also
List of rivers of Rio Grande do Sul

References

Rivers of Rio Grande do Sul